Lord Berkeley may refer to:

Michael Berkeley, Baron Berkeley of Knighton (born 1948), English composer and broadcaster
Anthony Gueterbock, 18th Baron Berkeley (born 1939), British aristocrat and parliamentarian
 John Berkeley, 1st Baron Berkeley of Stratton (1602–1678)
Any male holder of the titles Baron (and Earl) Berkeley or Baron Berkeley of Stratton

See also 
 Berkeley (surname)